Kassari is an Estonian island. It has an area of 19.3 km2 with a population of around 300. It has a museum dedicated to Oskar Kallas and Aino Kallas.

The philosopher and pedagogue Ülo Kaevats (born 1947) was born on Kassari.

See also
 List of islands of Estonia

Estonian islands in the Baltic
Hiiumaa Parish